FK Pārdaugava was a Latvian football club based in Riga. It was founded in 1984 as Daugava-RVR and became defunct in 1995.

In 1991 it replaced the bankrupt FC Daugava Riga and played in the Soviet First League. It completed the 1991 season in last place (22nd).
After the fall of the Soviet Union, FK Pārdaugava for few seasons played in the Latvian Higher League. In 1995 with the bankruptcy of its sponsors the club was dissolved.

Name history
 1984: Daugava-RVR
 1985–1987: Junioru izlase ('Junior selection')
 1988–1989: Jaunatnes izlase ('Youth selection')
 1990–1995: FK Pārdaugava

Honours
Latvian Higher League
Runners-up (1): 1991
Latvian Cup
Runners-up (1): 1993

Notable players
 Marians Pahars
 Andrejs Piedels
 Dzintars Zirnis
 Oļegs Blagonadeždins

See also
 Olimpija Rīga

References

Defunct football clubs in Latvia
Association football clubs established in 1984
Association football clubs disestablished in 1995